KHS Musical Instruments Co., Ltd was founded in Taiwan in 1930 as an educational products company, and gained success in the 1950s as a producer of musical instruments. In 2020, KHS is a full-scale musical instrument manufacturer of a complete line of wind instruments, percussion, fretted instrument, and stand products.

History 
KHS was first founded with the Wan Wu (萬屋株式會社) name in Taiwan in 1930 as an educational products company and was renamed to KHS in 1945.
KHS stands for Kung Hsue She (功學社) which means a company helping schools and culture.
KHS started harmonica production in 1956 and started band instrument production a year later in 1957.
By 1980 KHS was a full-scale musical instrument manufacturer and the Jupiter brand was started to market a complete line of wind instruments and percussion.  KHS also began supplying instruments for export and sale under the American Vito brand.  
In 1985 KHS established the Musix company. KHS established Altus Co., Ltd. to manufacture professional flutes in 1990, and acquired Ross Mallet Instruments in 1994.  Since 2010 Jupiter manufactures the ST line of saxophones for the German company Keilwerth.

Brands
Jupiter Band Instruments
Mapex Drums
Altus Flutes
Hercules Stands
Ross Mallet Instruments
Majestic Concert Percussion
Lanikai Ukuleles

References
Jupiter Band Instruments
KHS-Music
Jupiter Factories Tours
Walden Guitars

External links
NAMM Oral History Interview with Wu H. Hsieh (2004)
NAMM Oral History Interview with CEO Karl Leong (2013)

Musical instrument manufacturing companies of Taiwan
Clarinet manufacturing companies
Percussion instrument manufacturing companies
Guitar manufacturing companies
Manufacturing companies established in 1930
Chinese companies established in 1930